This is a non-exhaustive list of prominent companies based in Hyderabad, Telangana (i.e. having their headquarters in Hyderabad).

 Adyar Ananda Bhavan
 Aurobindo Pharma
 Biological E. Limited
 Bharat Biotech
 Brightcom Group
 Cyient
 Deccan chronicle
 Divi's Laboratories
 Dr. Reddy's Laboratories
 Electronics Corporation of India
 ETV Network
 Glenmark Pharmaceuticals
 GMR Group
 GVK
 Heritage Foods
 Hetero Drugs
 Indian Drugs and Pharmaceuticals (IDPL)
 Indian Immunologicals Limited
 Krishna Institute of Medical Sciences
 Laurus Labs
 Satyam Computer Services Ltd
 NMDC
 Navayuga Group
 Natco Pharma
 Nuclear Fuel Complex
 Pulsus Group
 Skyroot Aerospace
 Tata Business Support Services 
 Tata Advanced Systems
 TruJet
 Wzaayif Private Limited

See also
 List of companies based in Gurgaon

References

Hyderabad
Companies